Clive Selsby Revill (born 18 April 1930) is a New Zealand actor, best known for his performances in musical theatre and the London stage. A veteran of the Royal Shakespeare Company, he has also starred in numerous films and television programmes, often in character parts. He is a two-time Tony Award nominee; Best Featured Actor in a Musical for Irma La Douce and Best Actor in a Musical for Oliver! He was also nominated for the Golden Globe Award for Best Supporting Actor for his performance in Billy Wilder's Avanti! (1972).

His roles also include voicing the Emperor in the original theatrical edition of The Empire Strikes Back (1980).

Early life
Revill was born on 18 April 1930 in Wellington, the son of Eleanor May (née Neel) and Malet Barford Revill. He attended Rongotai College.

Career

Stage
He originally trained to be an accountant in New Zealand, but decided to change his career path in 1950 when he made his stage debut as Sebastian in Twelfth Night. He moved to London in 1950 and studied acting there at the Old Vic Theatre. He appeared in The Shakespeare Memorial Theatre Company's celebrated 1956–1958 season of productions in Stratford, which included Hamlet, Love's Labour's Lost, The Merchant of Venice, Julius Caesar and The Tempest. He went on to have such varied stage roles as Bob (narrator) in Irma la Douce, Ratty in Toad of Toad Hall and Jean-Paul Marat in Marat/Sade.

He made his Broadway debut in 1952, playing Sam Weller in The Pickwick Papers, and subsequently appeared in Irma La Douce, The Incomparable Max and Oliver!, for which his Fagin was nominated for a Tony Award. He is also known for his roles in the operettas of Gilbert and Sullivan, on both stage and television. He starred in the first national tour of the musical Drood, replacing George Rose, who was murdered during the run.

He also participated in the workshop production of Tom Jones: The Musical, playing the role of Squire Western and reprising it on the cast recording.

Film
His red hair and distinctive Mr. Punch-like features often saw him cast as comic eccentrics in a number of British films of the 1960s and 1970s such as Kaleidoscope (1966), Modesty Blaise (1966), The Double Man (1967), Fathom (1967), The Assassination Bureau (1969), A Severed Head (1970), The Black Windmill (1974) and One of Our Dinosaurs Is Missing (1975). He also had notable supporting turns in Otto Preminger's Bunny Lake Is Missing (1965) opposite Laurence Olivier, and his American film debut A Fine Madness (1966), as well as a rare leading role in the horror film The Legend of Hell House (1973).

He was often cast as humorous foreign characters (he has played everything from Chinese to Russian). Two of his highest profile roles of this kind were in two films for Billy Wilder: The Private Life of Sherlock Holmes (1970) and Avanti! (1972), for which he was nominated for a Golden Globe Award for his part as put-upon hotel manager Carlo Carlucci.

Television
In the 1978 television miniseries Centennial, he played the Scottish accountant Finlay Perkin. He played both Ko-Ko (the starring role) in The Mikado, and the title character, John Wellington Wells, in The Sorcerer for the Brent Walker television series of Gilbert and Sullivan productions, shown by the BBC in 1983.

After relocating to the United States, he guest-starred in many television series, such as Columbo (1978, "The Conspirators"), Hart to Hart, Dynasty, Magnum, P.I., The Love Boat, Remington Steele, Murder, She Wrote, Babylon 5, The Feather and Father Gang, Newhart, MacGyver, Dear John, The Fall Guy, Maude, and Star Trek: The Next Generation. He starred as the wizard Vector in the short-lived series Wizards and Warriors.

Voice work
Revill is known for his proficiency with accents. He is also known for his voice work in feature-length films and animated series, which includes Alfred Pennyworth in the first three episodes of Batman: The Animated Series, the voice of Chico in the seven episodes of Chico the Rainmaker (The Boy with the Two Heads) (1974), the voice of Emperor Palpatine/Darth Sidious in the original 1980 version of The Empire Strikes Back (he was later replaced by Ian McDiarmid in the 2004 DVD version though Revill is still credited) numerous cartoons such as The Transformers, Batman: The Animated Series and DuckTales and more video games, including Marvel: Ultimate Alliance and Conquest: Frontier Wars.

Filmography

Film

Television

Video games

Other

 Peter Pan's Flight (1955)

Stage credits (partial)

Notes

References

External links
 
 
 
 
 Clive Revill at Aveleyman.com

1930 births
Living people
20th-century New Zealand male actors
21st-century New Zealand male actors
Audiobook narrators
New Zealand male film actors
New Zealand male stage actors
New Zealand male television actors
New Zealand male video game actors
New Zealand male voice actors
Male actors from Wellington City
People educated at Rongotai College